The 2014 Alaska gubernatorial election took place on November 4, 2014, to elect the governor and lieutenant governor of Alaska, concurrently with the election of Alaska's Class II U.S. Senate seat, as well as other elections to the United States Senate in other states and elections to the United States House of Representatives and various state and local elections.

Incumbent Republican Governor Sean Parnell ran for re-election to a second full term in office, but incumbent lieutenant governor Mead Treadwell instead chose to run for the U.S. Senate.  Primary elections were held on August 19, 2014, to determine party nominees for the office, with separate primaries held for governor and lieutenant governor and the winners running together on the same ticket.

Parnell was renominated; his running mate was Anchorage Mayor Dan Sullivan.  The Democrats nominated businessman and former executive director of the Alaska Permanent Fund Byron Mallott, whose running mate was State Senator Hollis French.  Also running as an independent was former Republican mayor of Valdez Bill Walker, whose running mate was Craig Fleener, the former deputy commissioner of the Alaska Department of Fish and Game.

On September 2, 2014, Walker and Mallott merged their campaigns to appear on the November ballot as a single independent ticket, which the Alaska Democratic Party endorsed. On this ticket, Walker ran for governor with Mallott as his running mate. Both candidates' former running mates withdrew. Parnell was considered vulnerable, as reflected in his low approval ratings. The consensus among The Cook Political Report, Governing, The Rothenberg Political Report, Sabato's Crystal Ball, Daily Kos Elections, and others was that the contest was a tossup. Former Republican governor Sarah Palin, who had praised Parnell as her successor when she resigned in 2009, endorsed Walker and Mallott, taking issue with Parnell's tax cuts for the oil and gas industry.

On November 7, Walker and Mallott held a 3,165-vote lead, which on November 11 had grown to 4,004 out of some 244,000 votes cast, or 1.6%. Walker began preparing for a transition but the race remained officially uncalled and Parnell refused to concede. On November 14, after Walker and Mallott extended their lead to 4,634 votes, multiple media outlets called the race. Parnell conceded the following day. His loss – coupled with Democrat Mark Begich's defeat in the U.S. Senate election – marked just the fifth time in the last 50 years in which an incumbent governor and senator from different political parties were defeated in the same state in the same election cycle.

Republican primary

Governor

Candidates

Declared
 Gerald L. "Tap" Heikes, minister, candidate for governor in 2006 and 2010 and candidate for the U.S. Senate in 2008
 Russ Millette, former chairman-elect of the Alaska Republican Party
 Sean Parnell, incumbent governor
 Brad Snowden, candidate for governor in 2002

Withdrew
 Bill Walker, former mayor of Valdez and candidate for governor in 2010 (ran as an independent)

Polling

Results

Lieutenant governor

Candidates

Declared
 Dan Sullivan, Mayor of Anchorage
 Kelly Wolf, Kenai Peninsula Borough Assemblyman and former state representative

Withdrew
 Lesil McGuire, state senator

Results

Democratic–Libertarian–Independence primary
Candidates from the Alaska Democratic Party, Alaska Libertarian Party and Alaskan Independence Party appear on the same ballot, with the highest-placed candidate from each party receiving that party's nomination.

Governor

Democratic candidates

Declared
 Byron Mallott, businessman, former mayor of Juneau, former president of the Alaska Federation of Natives and former executive director of the Alaska Permanent Fund
 Phil Stoddard, candidate for the U.S. Senate in 1984 and candidate for governor in 1986

Withdrew
 Hollis French, state senator and candidate for governor in 2010 (running for Lieutenant Governor)

Declined
 Ethan Berkowitz, former Minority Leader of the Alaska House of Representatives, nominee for lieutenant governor in 2006, for Congress in 2008 and governor in 2010
 Les Gara, state representative
 Scott McAdams, former mayor of Sitka and nominee for the U.S. Senate in 2010
 Bill Wielechowski, state senator

Libertarian candidates

Declared
 Carolyn Clift, treasurer of the Alaska Libertarian Party

Results

Lieutenant governor

Democratic candidates

Declared
 Hollis French, state senator and candidate for governor in 2010
 Bob Williams, teacher

Libertarian candidates

Declared
 Andrew C. Lee, gold miner

Results

Others

Constitution Party
 J. R. Myers, founder and chairman of the Alaska Constitution Party
Running mate: Maria Rensel

Independent
 Bill Walker, former mayor of Valdez and Republican candidate for governor in 2010
Running mate: Byron Mallott, businessman, former mayor of Juneau, former president of the Alaska Federation of Natives and former executive director of the Alaska Permanent Fund
Former running mate: Craig Fleener, former deputy commissioner of the Alaska Department of Fish and Game

General election

Campaign
Parnell drew criticism during his re-election campaign over his support of billions in tax reductions for the petrochemical industry as well an exploding scandal featuring five years of alleged cover ups with regard to rampant sexual abuse, cronyism, corruption and whistleblower suppression, in the Alaska National Guard.

In October 2014, former Alaska Governor Sarah Palin endorsed Walker and Mallott. The endorsement was prompted by Parnell's oil and gas industry tax cuts, which dismantled her administration's "Alaska's Clear and Equitable Share" (ACES) plan. She had previously supported a referendum to repeal the tax cuts, which was narrowly defeated in August 2014. Walker and Mallott made the repeal of the tax cuts a centerpiece of their campaign.

Debates
Complete video of debate, October 1, 2014 - C-SPAN

Predictions

Polling

 * Internal poll for Bill Walker campaign

Results

See also

 2014 United States elections
 2014 United States gubernatorial elections
Elections in Alaska
 2014 United States House of Representatives election in Alaska
 2014 United States Senate election in Alaska

References

External links
 Alaska gubernatorial election, 2014 at Ballotpedia
 Byron Mallott for Governor
 J. R. Myers for Governor
 Sean Parnell for Governor incumbent
 Bill Walker for Governor

Gubernatorial
2014
Alaska